"Cinnamon Girl" is a song by American singer and songwriter Lana Del Rey from her sixth studio album, Norman Fucking Rockwell! (2019). The song was written and produced by Del Rey and Jack Antonoff.

Background
Del Rey first previewed the song on her Instagram account on October 12, 2018, deleting her post with the sample later that same day. She shared a second snippet via Instagram on October 15, 2018, showcasing the chorus of the song. The song was initially believed to be titled "Cinnamon", which was also the original name for Del Rey's Born to Die song "Radio", which features the line "Now my life is sweet like cinnamon/Like a fucking dream I'm living in".

While promoting her record Lust for Life (2017), Del Rey stated in an interview with Pitchfork:
 Following a fan posting that quote online, Del Rey commented on the post that "The quote [from Pitchfork] is a perfect quote to go along with cinnamon [sic]. Some people don’t deserve a chance."

Lyrics and composition
"Cinnamon Girl" was written and produced by Del Rey and Jack Antonoff, while being mixed by Laura Sisk, mastered by Chris Gehringer with Will Quinnell and Jonathan Sher, while being recorded at Conway Recording Studios in Los Angeles, California. Lyrically, the song speaks of a toxic relationship in which Del Rey hints at a lover trying to become estranged from her while being a prescription pill addict ("You try to push me out/But I just find my way back in").
The outro of the song samples "Wild Heart" by the band of producer Jack Antonoff.

Several critics reviewing the record made connections between the song and Neil Young's 1969 song of the same name, citing Del Rey's use of the title as possibly an homage to him.  include Del Rey's soft, almost shaky vocals on the song as well as the electronic beats used in the studio version of the song.

Critical reception
Upon the release of Norman Fucking Rockwell, the song received acclaim from critics for the most part, with several calling it a "standout track" on the album. Raisa Burner of Time gave the song a positive review, praising the song for Del Rey's "angelic falsetto even as she describes emotional devastation". Kitty Power of The Guardian cited "Cinnamon Girl" as a standout track compared to the rest of the record, due to its production being different than the rest of the album: "[the record] exists in some timeless, catgut-strewn place where 3am bar pianos and washes of keyboards serve as the tear-stained mat under Del Rey’s glass slipper of a voice – until, that is, a song such as Cinnamon Girl suddenly unspools an unexpectedly long, lyrical instrumental coda, in an electronic-tinged echo of Young’s famous meandering." Radio.com called the song a "standout" and "fan favorite". Alexis Petridis of The Guardian praised the song's EDM influences, pointing out its instrumental differences to the majority of songs on the record which have more of a folk-rock and surf pop sound. Lindsay Zoldaz of The Ringer praised Del Rey's ability to find the good in the bad: "Amid all the chaos and hurricanes, though, there is a radical kind of tenderness now present in Del Rey's music, a preserved innocence that once seemed irrevocably lost. Even if it’s only temporary, she reminds us, love can build shelter from the storm."

Ann Powers controversy

In her review of Norman Fucking Rockwell for NPR, famed critic Ann Powers gave the record a positive review, but was somewhat critical of "Cinnamon Girl", writing that:

Del Rey took to Twitter to denounce the article, writing that "...I don't even relate to one observation you made about the music. There's nothing uncooked about me. To write about me is nothing like it is to be with me. Never had a persona. Never needed one. Never will", in one tweet and "So don't call yourself a fan like you did in the article and don't count your editor one either – I may never never have made bold political or cultural statements before- because my gift is the warmth I live my life with and the self reflection I share generously", in another one.

Following backlash from Del Rey's fans, Powers refused to change her opinion, stating that: "It is a critic's responsibility to be thoughtful and honest to herself in responding to artists' work, and an artist's prerogative to disagree with that response. I respect Lana Del Rey and hope that her music continues to receive the passionate appreciation it has received for years." Powers then took to Twitter to announce she would be taking a few days off of social media, encouraging people "I still think NFR is a deeply compelling, crucial album and hope everyone spends time listening to it (and goes back to Ultraviolence and Lust For Life too)..."

Shortly afterwards, Del Rey received criticism from music critics and fans of Powers alike. Jessica Hopper criticized Del Rey taking offense to Powers' critic of "Cinnamon Girl", citing Powers' coverage of female artists as what she believes to be what has allowed women to be taken more seriously in the music industry. The conflict became a top story on Twitter, with "Ann Powers" and "Cinnamon Girl" becoming trending topics nationwide in the US and several other territories.

Credits and personnel
Credits adapted from the liner notes of Norman Fucking Rockwell.

Personnel
 Lana Del Rey – vocals, songwriting, production
 Jack Antonoff – songwriting, production, engineering, mixing, programming, guitar, keyboards, piano
 Laura Sisk – engineering, mixing
 Jonathan Sher – assistant engineering
 Chris Gehringer – mastering
 Will Quinnell – assistant mastering
Technical
 Mastered at Sterling Sound
 Recorded at Conway Recording Studios, Los Angeles, United States

Charts

References

2010s ballads
Electronic songs
Lana Del Rey songs
2019 songs
Music controversies
Songs written by Lana Del Rey
Songs written by Jack Antonoff
Song recordings produced by Lana Del Rey
Song recordings produced by Jack Antonoff